Steven McClintock is an American singer, songwriter, and a music producer, with almost 20 million records sold to his credit.  He has written top 40 hit songs in country, pop and AOR.  He has been a part of the music group Fertitta & McClintock (with David Fertitta) since the mid-1970s (they won the "Overall Grand Prize" and "Best Group/Duo" at the International Acoustic Music Awards).  He also has done solo work like the song "Maybe Love" on the Jetsons: The Movie soundtrack, as well as "Edge of a Dream", the soundtrack to the movie Space Mutiny, which was memorably lambasted by the cast of Mystery Science Theater 3000, the song was likewise mocked when it appeared in the closing credits as "Music rejected by the band Survivor," with the 'bots (Tom Servo and Crow T. Robot) "singing along" using lyrics from other tracks. In January 2009, the track was finally released commercially through McClintock's official Myspace website.

He co-writes with Tim James and together they formed McJames Music Inc.  Mr. McClintock has recorded two solo albums, and he won a BMI Songwriter Award for Tiffany's Billboard Hot 100 No. 6 hit "All This Time".

In 2019 he managed Michael Peterson, and recorded songs for his solo album.

Artists who have recorded songs written, published or produced by McClintock
White Apple Tree
Andy Williams
Shiny Toy Guns
Robin Schulz
Michael Peterson
Tiffany
Pat Boone
Fertitta & McClintock
Juice Newton (Take Heart)
Wickety Wak
Tumbleweed
Danny Shirley (of Confederate Railroad)
Victoria Shaw
Paul Jefferson
Sixwire
ATC (the band) A Touch of Class
Alex Boye
Trademark
Crowtown
The Nelsons
Pingpong
Damon Sharpe (of Guys Next Door)
PC Quest
Judy Akin
Cris Barber
Alana Lee
Mark Vance
Shuja

External links
Steven McClintock on Myspace
the official Fertitta & McClintock website

American male songwriters
American record producers
Living people
1953 births